Parliamentary elections were held in Norway between 6 August and 16 September 1903. The result was a victory for the Conservative Party-Moderate Liberal Party-Coalition Party alliance, which won 62 of the 117 seats in the Storting. It was the first time that the Labour Party gained seats. It was also the last election in Norway when Norway was in the union with Sweden that existed between 1814 and 1905.

Results

References

General elections in Norway
1900s elections in Norway
Norway
Parliamentary
Norway
Norway